Michael Sean Winters is an American journalist and writer who covers politics and events in the Roman Catholic Church for the National Catholic Reporter, where his blog "Distinctly Catholic" can be found.

Bio
"Distinctly Catholic" received the Catholic Press Association award for "Best Individual Blog" multiple times. Winters is also the US correspondent for The Tablet, the London-based international Catholic weekly. He is currently a Senior Fellow at the Greenberg Center for the Study of Religion in Public Life at Trinity College in Hartford, Connecticut.

Winters previously served as a visiting fellow at Catholic University's Institute for Policy Research and Catholic Studies, but is no longer connected to the institute.

Winters has described himself as an "Ella Grasso Democrat," a reference to the pro-labor, pro-life, pro-Israel Governor of Connecticut in the 1970s. Winters has written in opposition to the agenda of President Donald Trump.

Works
Winters's writing has appeared in The Washington Post, The New Republic, the New York Times Magazine.

Books
 Left at the Altar: How the Democrats Lost the Catholics and How the Catholics Can Save the Democrats
 God's Right Hand: How Jerry Falwell Made God a Republican and Baptized the American Right, HarperCollins (2012)

References

External links
Michael Sean Winters

American online journalists
Living people
American Roman Catholics
American magazine journalists
Year of birth missing (living people)